Philomel (or Stahlgeige ) is the name of a musical instrument similar to the violin, but having four steel, wire strings. The strings are fretless, like the violin.

It was invented around Monaco di Baviera in the middle of the nineteenth century and has similarities with the Bowedmelodion also known as Streichmelodion.

The philomel has a body with incurvations similar to those of the guitar; therefore, without corner blocks, the outline of the upper lobe forms a wavy shoulder reminiscent of the viols but more ornate and fanciful. The peg-box sometimes terminates in a fancy head instead of a scroll. The philomel, never used in the orchestra, is considered by some the instrument of the dilettanti, frequently played in Germany with the bowed zither. The accordance of the philomel is the same as for the violin; the timbre is shrill and crystal-like. 

There is also an alto philomel corresponding to the viola. The  is similar to the philomel, and has four steel strings of the same accordance as the violin, but arranged in inverse order; instead of being held like the violin and philomel, under the chin, it is placed on the knees of the performer, so that a hook under the fingerboard rests against the table.

Philomel is also another name for the nightingale, which perhaps is where the instrument gets its name.

References

Attribution

Bowed string instruments